Noelia García Domenech (born 25 September 1992) is a Spanish footballer who plays as a goalkeeper for Eibar.

Club career
García started her career at Igualada.

References

External links
Profile at La Liga

1992 births
Living people
Women's association football goalkeepers
Spanish women's footballers
People from Igualada
Sportspeople from the Province of Barcelona
Footballers from Catalonia
SD Eibar Femenino players
Primera División (women) players
Segunda Federación (women) players
Sportswomen from Catalonia
Primera Federación (women) players
21st-century Spanish women